The Chevrolet El Camino is a coupé utility  vehicle that was produced by Chevrolet between 1959–60 and 1964–1987. Unlike a standard pickup truck, the El Camino was adapted from the standard two-door Chevrolet station wagon platform and integrated the cab and cargo bed into the body.

Introduced in the 1959 model year in response to the success of the Ford Ranchero coupé utility, its first run, based on the Biscayne's B-body, lasted only two years. Production resumed for the 1964–1977 model years based on the Chevelle platform, and continued for the 1978–1987 model years based on the GM G-body platform.

Although based on corresponding General Motors car lines, the vehicle is classified in the United States as a pickup. GMC's badge engineered El Camino variant, the Sprint, was introduced for the 1971 model year. Renamed Caballero in 1978, it was also produced through the 1987 model year.

Background
The concept of a two-door vehicle based on a passenger car chassis with a tray at the rear began in the United States in the 1920s with the roadster utility (also called "roadster pickup" or "light delivery") models.

Ford Australia was the first company to produce a coupé utility as a result of a 1932 letter from the wife of a farmer in Victoria, Australia, asking for "a vehicle to go to church in on a Sunday and which can carry our pigs to market on Mondays". Ford designer Lew Bandt developed a suitable solution, and the first coupé utility model was released in 1934. Bandt went on to manage Ford's Advanced Design Department, being responsible for the body engineering of the XP, XT, XW, and XA series Ford Falcon utilities. General Motors’ Australian subsidiary Holden also produced a Chevrolet coupé utility in 1935, and Studebaker produced the Coupé Express from 1937 to 1939. The body style did not reappear on the American market until the release of the 1957 Ford Ranchero.

Both the coupé utility and the similar open-topped roadster utility continued in production, but the improving economy of the mid- to late-1930s and the desire for improved comfort saw coupé utility sales climb at the expense of the roadster utility until, by 1939, the latter was all but a fading memory.

In 1957, Ford introduced the Ranchero, and established a new market segment in the U.S. of an automobile platform based coupé utility. In 1959, Chevrolet responded with the El Camino to compete with Ford's full-sized Ranchero. The original El Camino and Ranchero would compete directly only in the 1959 model year.

First generation (1959–1960)

The El Camino was introduced for the 1959 model year two years after the Ford Ranchero. According to Chevrolet stylist Chuck Jordan, GM Harley Earl had suggested a coupé pickup in 1952.

Like the Ranchero, it was based on an existing and modified platform, the new-for-1959 Brookwood two-door station wagon, itself based on the redesigned full-sized Chevrolet of that year. Highly stylized, it initially sold 50% more briskly than the more conservative Ranchero, some 22,000 to 14,000.

Unlike the Brookwoods wagon and a sedan delivery variant, the El Camino was available with any full-sized Chevrolet drivetrain. It came in a single trim level, its exterior using the mid-level Bel-Air's trim, and the interior of the low-end Biscayne. Its chassis featured Chevrolet's "Safety-Girder" X-frame design and a full-coil suspension, both introduced in the 1958 model year. The somewhat soft passenger car suspension of the base model left the vehicle level without a load, in contrast the Ranchero, where standard 1100-pound rated heavy duty rear springs gave it a distinct rake when empty. The quirky Level Air suspension option, in its second and final year, was listed as available, but was almost never seen on any Chevrolet model, much less an El Camino. The 1959 El Camino was promoted as the first Chevrolet pickup built with a steel bed floor instead of wood. The floor was a corrugated sheetmetal insert, secured with 26 recessed bolts. Concealed beneath it was the floor pan from the Brookwood two-door wagon, complete with foot wells. Box capacity was almost .

Among the performance engines offered were a 283-cid Turbo-Fire V8 with two- or four-barrel carburetion, several Turbo-Thrust 348-cid V8s with four-barrel or triple two-barrel carburetors producing , and 250- and 290-bhp 283-cube Ramjet Fuel Injection V8s.

A total of 22,246 El Caminos were produced for 1959. That bested the count of 21,706 first-year Rancheros made in 1957 and the 14,169 Ford sedan pickups built in direct competition for the 1959 model year.

The similar but less flamboyant 1960 model started at $2366 for the six-cylinder model; another $107 for a V8 with the two-barrel 283. At first glance, the exterior once again had a Bel Air look, with that series' bright-metal "jet" appliqué and narrow trailing molding used to accent the rear quarters. Inside, Biscayne/Brookwood appointments also persisted. The seat was now covered in striped-pattern cloth with vinyl facings. Available interior trim shades were once again gray, blue, and green. Floor coverings were in medium-tone vinyl.

Orders plummeted by a third, to just 14,163, at which point Chevrolet discontinued the model; meanwhile, Ford moved 21,027 Rancheros, which were now based on the brand-new Falcon compact. The pioneering American sedan pickups just did not connect with enough car-buying Americans. Perhaps these early "crossovers" didn't carry enough passengers; in a time when baby-boomer families dominated the market, three across was the best they could offer. Cargo volume was meager compared with pickup trucks.  The low-level trim and marketing efforts focused almost exclusively on commercial customers may have inhibited sales, as well.

Between the discontinuation of the first generation and the introduction of the second, the Chevrolet Greenbrier, based on the Corvair platform, replaced the El Camino as Chevrolet’s car-based pickup.

Second generation (1964–1967)

Chevrolet reintroduced the El Camino four years later based on the mid-size Chevrolet Chevelle. The 1964 model was similar to the Chevelle two-door wagon forward of the B-pillars and carried both "Chevelle" and "El Camino" badges, but Chevrolet marketed the vehicle as a utility model and the Chevelle's most powerful engines were not available. Added to the El Camino's option list during the course of the 1964 model year were two versions of the 327 cubic-inch small block V8 rated at —the latter featuring a higher compression ratio of 10.5:1, larger four-barrel carburetor and dual exhausts. El Caminos also featured Air shocks in the rear, as well as fully boxed frames. The shocks were continued over all generations, the frames only thru 1967.

1965
The 1965 El Camino received the same facelift as the 1965 Chevelle, with a more pronounced V-shaped front end, and a higher performance L79 version of the 327 engine rated at  that was also available in Chevelles.

1966
The 1965 327 would run low 15s in the 1/4 mile (at some 90 mph), while 1966 to 1969 models were easily into the mid- to upper-14s. New sheetmetal highlighted the 1966 El Camino, identical to the Chevelle. A new instrument panel with horizontal sweep speedometer was featured. Inside, the standard version featured a bench seat interior and rubber floor mat from the low-line Chevelle 300 series, while the Custom used a more upscale interior from the Chevelle Malibu with plusher cloth-and-vinyl or all-vinyl bench seats and deep twist carpeting, or optional Strato swivel bucket seats with console. A tachometer was optional.

1967
The 1967 El Camino followed the Chevelle's styling facelift with a new grille, front bumper, and trim. Air shocks remained standard equipment on the El Camino, allowing the driver to compensate for a load. The 1967 model year also brought the collapsible steering column and options of disc brakes and Turbo Hydramatic 400 3-speed automatic transmission. It was the second year the 396 (L35, L34, and L78) could be had in the El Camino (both 13480 300 Deluxe base and 13680 Malibu series). Since the L35 396/325 hp engine was the base for the SS396 series, the number of L35 engines reported sold by Chevrolet in 1967 (2,565) were sold in one of the two El Camino series, which were the only other series the engine could be ordered in. Since the L34 & L78 were available in either El Camino series as well as the two SS396 body styles, there is no way of knowing how many of these optional engines went to which body style. Chevrolet does report 17,176 L34 and 612 L78 engine options were sold in 1967 Chevelles, but there is no breakdown of body styles. The TH400 3-speed automatic was now available as an option (RPO M40) with the 396 engine in both the SS396 series and the 396-equipped El Caminos. The 3-speed manual transmission remained the standard transmission with a heavy duty (RPO M13) also available along with the 2-speed Powerglide and either M20 wide ratio or M21 close ratio 4-speed transmissions. Although there was no actual factory El Camino Super Sport until 1968, many owners have "cloned" '67 SS396s using 1967 Chevelle SS396 badges and trim.

Third generation (1968–1972)

Chevrolet introduced a longer El Camino in 1968, based on the Chevelle station wagon/four-door sedan wheelbase; it also shared Chevelle Malibu exterior and interior trims. The interior was revamped including cloth and vinyl or all-vinyl bench seats and deep twist carpeting. All-vinyl Strato bucket seats and center console were an $111 option. Power front disc brakes and Positraction were optional. A new, high-performance Super Sport SS396 version was launched. Returning to the official options list for the first time since late 1966 was the  L78. It had solid lifters, big-port heads, and an 800 cfm Holley four-barrel on a low-rise aluminum manifold. A three-speed manual was standard with all engines, and a four-speed or automatic was optional.
In 1968, the SS was a separate model (the "SS-396").

The 1969 models showed only minor changes, led by more-rounded front-end styling. A single chrome bar connected quad headlights, and a slotted bumper held the parking lights. New round instrument pods replaced the former linear layout. For the first time, the Chevrolet 350 V8 was used in an El Camino. The Super Sport group included a  396-cubic-inch V8 beneath a double-domed hood, along with a black-out grille displaying an SS emblem. More potent editions of the 396 engine, developing  also made the options list. Options included power windows and locks. Curiously, back-up lights moved from the rear bumper to the tailgate, where they were ineffective when the gate was down.

The 1970 models received sheet metal revisions that gave the bodies a more squared-up stance, and interiors were also redesigned.
The new SS396, which actually displaced  (although all emblems read 396) was available. Chevrolet's largest and most-powerful engine of the time was also put into a select few El Caminos.

The 1971 El Camino got fresh front-end styling (again shared with the Chevelle) that included large Power-Beam single-unit headlights, a reworked grille and bumper, and integral park/signal/marker lights. For 1971, mandated lower-octane unleaded fuel necessitated a reduction in engine compression, and GM's A.I.R. system, a "smog pump", was added to control tailpipe emissions.  Power and performance were reduced. Engine offerings for 1971 included the 250-6, small-block V8s of 307 and 350 cubic inches; and big block V8s of 402 and 454-cubic-inch displacements. Horsepower ratings of those engines for 1971 ranged from 145 for the six to 365 for the RPO LS5 454 – all in gross figures. The LS6 454 V8 was gone forever. A rebadged El Camino, the GMC Sprint debuted in 1971. It shared the same engine and transmission offerings as its Chevrolet counterpart.

The 1972 El Caminos wore single-unit parking and side marker lights on their front fenders, outside of a revised twin-bar grille, but little changed. For 1972, horsepower measurements were switched to the "net" figures as installed in a vehicle with all accessories and emission controls hooked up. Engine offerings included the  250-6, a 307 V8, a  350-cubic-inch V8, and big block V8s of 402 and 454 cubic-inch displacements. The 402-cubic-inch (still known as a 396) produced ; the 454 managed to put out  under the net rating system. Super Sport equipment could now be ordered with any V8 engine, including the base 307-cubic-inch version. All 1972 El Caminos with the 454 ci engine have a "W" as the fifth digit in the VIN, and the 454 was only available with Super Sport trim.

Fourth generation (1973–1977)

For 1973, the El Camino was redesigned. Matching the Chevelle line and using the wagon chassis, it was the largest El Camino generation. Energy-absorbing hydraulic front bumper systems on these vehicles added more weight. There were two different trim levels of El Caminos during this period. The base model and SS option shared interior and exterior appointments with the Chevelle Malibu, while the El Camino Classic (introduced for 1974) shared its trim with the more upscale Chevelle Malibu Classic.

The chassis design was as new as the bodies with  a wider wheel track, front and rear. The left wheel was adjusted to have slightly more positive camber than the right, which resulted in a more uniform and stable steering feel on high-crown road surfaces while maintaining excellent freeway cruise stability. Clearances for spring travel were also improved for a smoother ride over all types of surfaces; the coil springs at each wheel were computer-selected to match the individual car's weight. Front disc brakes were now standard on all '73 El Caminos. Additional new features were an acoustical double-panel roof, tighter-fitting glass, flush-style outside door handles, molded full-foam seat construction, flow-through power ventilation system, inside hood release, refined Delcotron generator and sealed side-terminal battery, a larger  fuel tank, and "flush and dry" rocker panels introduced first on the redesigned 1971 full-size Chevrolets. New options included swivel bucket seats (with console) and Turbine I urethane (backed by steel) wheels, as was the instrument gauge cluster. A benefit of the new body designs was much better visibility to which the unusually thin windshield pillars contributed. A structural improvement was a stronger design for the side door guard beams. El Caminos shared the "Colonnade" frameless door glass with other Chevelles, and would continue this feature into the next generation as well.

Hardened engine valve seats and hydraulic camshafts made these engines reliable for many miles, and allowed them to accept the increasingly popular unleaded regular gasoline. The three-speed manual transmission was standard; 4-speed manual and Turbo Hydra-Matic 3-speed automatic transmissions were optional. Crossflow radiators and coolant reservoirs prevented overheating.

The SS, then a trim option, included a black grill with SS emblem, bodyside striping, bright roof drip moldings, color-keyed dual sport mirrors, special front and rear stabilizer bars, rally wheels, 70-series raised white-lettered tires, special instrumentation and SS interior emblems.
The SS option was available with a 350 or 454 V8 with the 4-speed or Turbo Hydra-Matic transmissions. Also it was not widely known, but a Laguna S-3 front end could be fitted on these cars, and was available through the Central Office Production Option (COPO) system as code 6H1. It was not widely ordered by many however, more than likely due to limited information both on the part of customers and many dealers at the time.

The Estate (1973–1976), an option package, was first offered on the El Camino Standard and El Camino Custom, later only the El Camino Custom.

The 1974 El Caminos sported an elongated, Mercedes-type grille. Inside, the new top-of-the-line El Camino Classic featured luxurious interiors with notchback bench seats (or optional Strato bucket seats) upholstered in cloth or vinyl, carpeted door panels and woodgrain instrument panel trim. The 350 V8 became the base engine and a 400 V8 engine was new this year. The 454, the top engine, was available with the Turbo Hydra-Matic 400 automatic or 4-speed manual transmission.

The 1975 models featured a new grill, providing a fresh appearance. Suspension upgrades offered a quieter ride, and radial-ply tires became standard. Dual remote mirrors, new twin sport mirrors, intermittent wipers, and cruise control were among new convenience features this year. The 1975 high energy ignition (HEI) provided spark to the spark plugs with minimal maintenance and increased power. The larger distributor cap also provided better high-RPM performance by decreasing the likelihood of the spark conducting to the wrong terminal. It was not available in California, and the optional four-speed stick was no longer offered. Buyers could now choose an Econominder instrument package that included a vacuum gauge to point out when optimum fuel economy was being attained.

For 1976, El Camino Classic models now featured the new rectangular headlights that other high-end GM cars were sporting. These were quad units in stacked arrangement. The base model retained the previously used dual round headlights. All engines except the 250 I6 came with the Turbo Hydra-matic automatic transmission as the only transmission available. The 250 I6 came with a 3-speed manual or an optional Turbo Hydra-matic.

The 1977 models were little changed, except the 400 V8 was gone. The El Camino Classic was again the top model and the SS option continued.

Fifth generation (1978–1987)

The front end sheet metal and doors were shared with the Malibu, and the rear bumper was shared with the Malibu station wagon. For the first time, though, the El Camino had a unique chassis – it was shared with no other Chevrolet. The front end featured a new single rectangular headlight design. The base engine was a 200-cubic-inch (3.3-liter) V6 that developed , except in California where, to meet emissions standards, the 231-cubic-inch Buick engine was the base engine. It was not available on Malibu passenger cars (with exception to coupe and sedan Malibu 9C1 police vehicles).

Following its debut as a redesigned "new-size" model in 1978, the 1979 model received minimal changes, which amounted to a little more than a new divided grille. However, a "small-block" 267-cubic-inch (4.4-liter) V8 joined the options list and slotted between the standard 3.3-liter V6 and the optional 5.0-liter four-barrel V8. The 350-cubic-inch (5.7-liter) V8, developing  was again available. Both three- and four-speed manual transmissions had floor shifters.

The 1980 El Camino started out the 1980s with few changes, though engine choices were shuffled a little. The base V6 displaced 229 cubic inches, up from 200 the year before. The 350 with  offered in 1979 was dropped. A three speed floor shifted manual transmission was standard, but most got the optional three-speed automatic.

The 1981 models received a new horizontal tube grill. The 1981 engines mostly continued from 1980, but now used GM's Computer Command Control (CCC) emission system. The base 229-cubic-inch V6 made  (down from ), as did the California-only 231-cubic-inch Buick V6. The three-speed automatic added a lock-up torque converter to aid highway mileage.

1982–1987

The 1982 (through the final 1987) El Camino sported a new frontal appearance with a crosshatch grille flanked by quad rectangular headlights. New under the hood for 1982 was a  5.7-liter (350-cubic-inch) Diesel V8, which was also offered in Chevrolet's full-size cars. Though mileage with the diesel was commendable, it was an expensive option and would eventually amass a dismal repair record. Gasoline-engine choices were unchanged, except Chevrolet's 229-cubic-inch (3.8-liter) V6 was now standard in California-bound cars, replacing Buick's 231-cubic-inch V6.

In 1983, the 4.4-liter V8 was gone, leaving the 5.0-liter version as the only optional gas V8. The sister Malibu sedan and wagon were discontinued after the 1983 model year.

The 1983–87 El Camino was also offered as a cosmetic conversion through select dealers (completed by Choo-Choo Customs Inc., of Chattanooga, Tennessee). Modifications included an aerodynamic front end similar to the Monte Carlo SS, side exhaust skirts, and aluminum wheels. The conversion also included the addition of SS decals on the exterior of the body. However, the majority of El Caminos sent for customizing weren't actual Super Sports. That distinction was only obtained by ordering the 'SS Sport Decor' option package from the factory which carries an RPO code of Z15.

For 1985, GM shifted El Camino production to Mexico, and the new fuel-injected 4.3 L V6 became the base engine through 1987. El Camino production ended quietly in late 1987. Some model year 1987s (420 El Caminos and 325 GMC Caballeros) are listed as new car retail deliveries in calendar year 1988 based on their date of first retail sale. Speculation in online forums indicates 3GCCW80H2HS915586 "may" be the final vehicle. The GM Media Archive/Heritage Center confirmed that no 1988 El Caminos or Caballeros were ever produced.

South Africa

A range of Chevrolet models, based on the Holden HK, was introduced onto the South African market in 1969. A coupe utility version was released in 1971 under the Chevrolet El Camino name  and was offered with imported Holden 186 six and 308 V8 engines. A version of the later Holden HQ utility was marketed in South Africa as the Chevrolet El Camino AQ.
A facelifted El Camino AJ was released in 1976 with production ceasing in 1978.

Concept vehicles
In 1974, Chevrolet's sister division, Pontiac, reportedly took an El Camino body, grafted on the urethane-nose front end from its Grand Am series, added the GA's instrument panel, reclining Strato-bucket seats with adjustable lumbar support along with Pontiac's Rally II wheels. This was a styling exercise for a possible Pontiac version of the El Camino; the concept never reached production.

In 1992, GM unveiled an El Camino concept, basically a pickup variant of the Chevrolet Lumina Z34. The concept received mixed, mostly negative reviews, mostly because of its front wheel drive layout.

During the 1995 model year, GM had a concept El Camino based on the full-size
Caprice station wagon using the grille of a 1994–96 Impala SS; this concept was destined for production, but was shelved when GM decided to discontinue the B-platform car line at the end of 1996.

The Pontiac G8 ST was shown at the New York International Auto Show in March 2008. Based on the Holden Commodore Ute, it shared the G8 platform with a  cargo bed. The Sport Truck had the same , 6.0-liter V8 used in the G8 GT, as well as the 3.6-liter,  direct-injection V6. The G8 ST was slated for release as a 2010 model, but in January 2009, GM announced to dealers the G8 ST was cancelled due to budget cuts and restructuring, as well as the Pontiac brand being discontinued.  In 2011, GM again considered bringing back the El Camino under the Chevrolet brand as early as 2015.

References

External links

 
 Car Domain: 1959–1960/1964-1987 Chevrolet El Camino

El Camino
Rear-wheel-drive vehicles
Coupé utilities
Cars introduced in 1959
1960s cars
1970s cars
1980s cars
Muscle cars
Motor vehicles manufactured in the United States